Vice Admiral Michelle C. Skubic (born c. 1961) is a United States Navy officer serving as the Director of the Defense Logistics Agency since July 24, 2020.

Early life and education
Skubic is a 1988 graduate of California State University, Fullerton, with a Bachelor of Arts in Business Administration-Finance. She earned a Master of Science in Acquisition and Contract Management from the Naval Postgraduate School in 2001. She is also a graduate of the Joint Forces Staff College and the University of North Carolina Kenan-Flagler Executive Development Institute.

Naval career
Skubic is designated as a Naval Aviation and Surface Warfare Supply Corps officer and is a member of the Defense Acquisition Corps.

Skubic's operational assignments include: division officer in readiness and services billets, aboard , which included deployment for Operations Desert Shield and Desert Storm; supply officer aboard Precommissioning Unit (PCU) , built in Pascagoula, Mississippi; and supply officer aboard PCU , built in Newport News, Virginia, which was commissioned to the fleet in January 2009.  Additionally, she completed a tour forward-deployed as commander, Defense Logistics Agency (DLA) Support Team in Kuwait, where her team, in concert with other DLA activities, supported United States Central Command, United States Army Central and other department of defense organizations in sustaining the warfighter's requirements for Operations New Dawn and Enduring Freedom.

Skubic's shore assignments include: services officer and carrier readiness officer at Commander, Naval Air Force, United States Pacific Fleet, San Diego; combined bachelor quarters officer and aviation support division officer, Naval Air Station Sigonella, Sicily; deputy department head for program contracts, Naval Air Systems Command at Patuxent River, Maryland; deputy force supply officer, Commander, Naval Surface Forces, San Diego; director of supplier operations, DLA Aviation, Richmond, Virginia; commanding officer, Naval Supply Systems Command (NAVSUP) Fleet Logistics Center Norfolk, Virginia; chief of staff, NAVSUP, Mechanicsburg, Pennsylvania; director, Logistics, Fleet Supply and Ordnance, U.S. Pacific Fleet, Joint Base Pearl Harbor-Hickam, Hawaii; commander, DLA Land and Maritime, Columbus, Ohio and Commander, Naval Supply Systems Command (NAVSUP) and 48th Chief of Supply Corps.

Skubic became director of the Defense Logistics Agency on July 24, 2020.

Awards and decorations

References

1960s births
Year of birth uncertain
Living people
United States Navy officers
United States Navy admirals
California State University, Fullerton alumni
Naval War College alumni
Female admirals of the United States Navy
21st-century American women